Bayonet Point is a census-designated place (CDP) in Pasco County, Florida, United States. As of the 2010 Census, the population was 23,467.

Geography
Bayonet Point is located at  (28.322903, -82.683957).

Demographics

As of the census of 2010, there were 23,467 people, 10,727 total households, and 6,214 families residing in the CDP. The racial makeup of the CDP was 92.3% White, 1.9% African American, 0.3% Native American, 1.2% Asian, 0.1% Pacific Islander, 1.9% from other races, and 2.3% from two or more races. Hispanic or Latino of any race were 9% of the population.

Of the 6,214 family households, 19.5% had children under the age of 18 living with them. 40.1% were married couples living together, 12.9% had a female householder with no husband present, 5% had a male householder with no wife present. Of the 10,727 total households, 42.1% were non-families. 35.1% of all households were made up of individuals, and 22.5% had someone living alone who was 65 years of age or older.

In the CDP, the population was spread out, with 18.4% under the age of 18.  The median age was 48.9 years.

References

External links
Origins of Place Names (History of Pasco County)

Census-designated places in Pasco County, Florida
Census-designated places in Florida